Maude Mary Haydon (6 November 1886 – 9 January 1978) was an Australian pastoral and landscape artist.

Early life 
Maude Mary Haydon was born at Bloomfield near Murrurundi, New South Wales on 6 November 1886. She was raised a middle child in a pastoral family of 6 on Bloomfield station, but was handicapped by deafness. Haydon was a good horsewoman who rode from an early age under the watchful eye of her father Bernard Haydon a renowned horseman and master of Bloomfield. She developed and maintained a keen interest in the sport of horse racing for the rest of her life. She finished her education at 17 years of age at SCEGGS, Darlinghurst, Sydney, where she showed a talent for art.

Career 
Haydon was trained by English art teacher Julian Ashton at his renowned Art School in Sydney in the 1900s. She caused a moral scandal when she took a group of Bohemian art students camping in the mountains of the Upper Hunter on H.L. White's Belltrees station at Woolooma near Scone. They also climbed 900 metres above the landscape to the top of Mt Woolooma. Haydon produced large numbers of watercolour impressionist style works, depicting scenes of Bloomfield and the landscapes of the Upper Hunter over many years. Haydon contributed works to the Women Artists exhibition in Sydney in 1934. Haydon frequently gave her paintings away to family and friends and they formed a tangible and evocative bond with Bloomfield. She also donated them to assist in fundraising.

Haydon travelled aged 27 with her sister Madge Haydon, on a steamship to Europe to obtain specialist medical treatment for deafness in Vienna, Austria in 1914, but unfortunately World War I (WWI) interrupted the plan. Haydon was adventurous and they turned disappointment into a holiday and saw the sights. Haydon and her sister visited Victorian portrait artist Agnes Goodsir and her brother, banker and friend of Bernard Haydon, Noel Goodsir in Maida Vale, London, England. They visited Hayden relatives in Ireland, who took the ladies riding on a fox hunt. They climbed 1,300 metres above the landscape to the top of snow-covered Ben Nevis with Agnes Goodsir. Haydon later donated £5 to Agnes for the care of wounded WWI soldiers recovering in her home.

Personal life 
Haydon was a good friend of Noel's son Norman Goodsir, and they maintained a correspondence during his explosive service in the AIF Artillery in France in WWI. He was tragically murdered in London in 1919 and she never married. Haydon spent her life living and working at 'Bloomfield' homestead with the Haydon family. She maintained close relations with most of its members, and was a prolific correspondent who kept them all informed of the news of the family. After the death of her father in 1932, she arranged Christmas gatherings at 'Bloomfield' that was attended by a crowd of family and friends from at least 2 States for over 40 years. During WWII she hosted soldiers wives and children of the Upper Hunter to a wonderful Christmas dinner party.

Haydon was a prominent social identity of the Upper Hunter. She was a bright personality, who was an excellent communicator despite her deafness and very generous. She used to drive a cart pulled by 'Jolly' the horse around the district, delivering mail until the 1950s. After her mother died in 1942, she became the mistress of Bloomfield homestead and continued to keep an open door house. Haydon collected guests from the Blandford Railway Station in a horse and sulky and later in a car, for over 50 years.

Maude Haydon died at 91 years of age in 1978 and was buried in Murrurundi Cemetery.

References

1880s births
1978 deaths
20th-century Australian artists